Harewood is a village, civil parish, former manor and ecclesiastical parish, in West Yorkshire, England, today in the metropolitan borough of the City of Leeds. The civil parish population at the 2011 census was 3,734.

Etymology
The name of Harewood is first attested in the tenth-century Rushworth Gospels manuscript, in the form æt Harawuda ('at Harewood'); it is next attested in the Domesday Book of 1086, as Hareuuode. Although consideration has been given to an origin involving the Old English word hār ('grey'), commentators agree that, as the name's present-day form suggests, the name comes from the Old English words hara ('hare') and wudu ('wood'). Thus it once meant 'wood characterised by hares'.

Location
Harewood sits in the Harewood ward of Leeds City Council and Elmet and Rothwell parliamentary constituency.

The A61 from Leeds city centre to Harrogate passes through the village. The A659 from Collingham joins the A61 outside the main entrance to Harewood House to descend the slopes of the Wharfe valley before continuing towards Pool-in-Wharfedale.

Amenities

The Harewood Arms public house and hotel is opposite the entrance to the Harewood Estate.

Other facilities in the village include a medical centre, mobile library, community cafe, and a village hall.

It is the location of the UK's longest motorsport hillclimb, Harewood speed Hillclimb (pronounced ). The exterior set for the soap opera Emmerdale is located in the Harewood estate.

Education
Harewood C of E Primary School is a state-funded faith school which stands opposite the grounds of the Harewood estate on the A61 and was built by the estate in 1864 for estate workers' children. In 2005 and 2008 the school was awarded "outstanding" grading following Ofsted inspections. The school maintains its historic links with the estate, the children regularly use its grounds and educational facilities.

Gateways School is an independent private school with a sixth form. The junior school and nursery are co-educational, admitting boys and girls to age 11.

Manor
The manor of Harewood was the seat of the de Romelli family, from which it passed by marriage of the heiress Avice de Romelli to her husband William de Curcy II (d. circa 1130), feudal baron of Stoke Curcy (now Stogursey) in Somerset, whose granddaughter and eventual heiress Alice de Curcy (sister and heiress of William de Curcy IV (d.1194)) married Warin FitzGerold (1167-post-1216), eldest son and heir of Henry FitzGerold (d.1174/5), Chamberlain to King Henry II. Alice's daughter and sole heiress was Margaret FitzGerold, who married Baldwin de Redvers  (1200–1216), eldest son and heir apparent of William de Redvers, 5th Earl of Devon (d.1217) and father of Baldwin de Redvers, 6th Earl of Devon. The eventual heiress was Isabel de Forz, eldest daughter of Baldwin de Redvers, 6th Earl of Devon (1217–1245). Her heir to the manor of Harewood was her distant cousin Warin de Lisle (d.1296) of Cambridgeshire, whose paternal grandmother was Alice FitzGerold. The De Lisle family then moved their seat to Rougemont Castle within the manor of Harewood. Warin's son was Robert de Lisle, 1st Baron Lisle (title created 1311) called "of Rougemont" to distinguish his family from the unrelated Baron Lisle "of Wootton, Isle of Wight", created in 1299. The site of Rougemont Castle was abandoned in about 1366 when the Lisle family built Harewood Castle nearby, of which much of the ruined stone structure survives, also hidden in overgrown woodland. Harewood Castle itself was abandoned as a residence soon after 1600 when it was owned by Sir William Wentworth of Gawthorpe Hall. The manor of Harewood containing both ruined castles was purchased in 1738 by the Lascelles family, which built there as its seat the surviving palatial 18th-century mansion known as Harewood House, still owned by the family, which was created Earl of Harewood in 1812.

Harewood House

Harewood House, a country house was designed by architects John Carr and Robert Adam, and built between 1759 and 1771 for Edwin Lascelles, 1st Baron Harewood.

All Saints' Church

All Saints' Church, the former parish church, stands to the west of the village, in the grounds of Harewood House which was built in the 18th century. The village was relocated in the late 18th century, leaving the church isolated from the village population.  It is a Grade I listed building but is no longer used regularly for worship and is in the care of the Churches Conservation Trust.

Location grid

See also
 Harwood (disambiguation)
 Harewood Castle
 Listed buildings in Harewood, West Yorkshire

References

External links

 Harewood Parish Council Website
 

Places in Leeds
Villages in West Yorkshire
Civil parishes in West Yorkshire